Willy Reyes Wang (born 12 November 1983) is a former wushu taolu athlete from the Philippines. He is one of the most decorated Filipino wushu athletes of all time in international competition and became especially renowned after his gold medal victory at the 2008 Beijing Wushu Tournament.

Career 
For most of his career, Wang was a changquan athlete who also practiced jianshu and qiangshu. He made his international debut at the 1999 World Wushu Championships in Hong Kong and won the silver medal in jianshu. He then appeared at the 2001 Southeast Asian Games where he impressively won a gold and a bronze medal. In 2003, he won the bronze medal in qiangshu at the 2003 World Wushu Championships, and was a double gold medalist at the 2003 Southeast Asian Games.  He extended his championship titles in the jianshu and qiangshu events once again at the 2005 Southeast Asian Games. A few days later, he competed at the 2005 World Wushu Championships but did not place.

After his competitions in 2005, Wang transitioned to training nanquan after having an extensive competitive career in changquan. His first experience in the nanquan category was at the 2006 Asian Games and placed seventh in the nanquan combined event. He considerably improved, and a year later in the 2007 World Wushu Championships, Wang won the gold medal in nanquan, placed fourth in nandao, and sixth in nangun. From these placements, he was the most consistent athlete at the competition and thus qualified for the Beijing Wushu Tournament. A month after the 2007 world championship, he won the gold medal in the nanquan event at the 2007 Southeast Asian Games.

The Philippines delegation at the 2008 Summer Olympics in Beijing was unable to win a single medal for the third consecutive Olympiad. At the Beijing Wushu Tournament, Wang made up for this loss in the men's nanquan medal event and won the gold medal. Wang's victory was celebrated throughout the Philippines as he became the second person to win a gold medal at an Olympic-style event for the Philippines; albeit an unofficial event.

In 2009, Wang announced his retirement from competition. He now runs the Willy Wang Wushu Center, a wushu school located in Manila.

References

External links 

 Athlete profile at the 2008 Beijing Wushu Tournament

1983 births
Living people
Filipino wushu practitioners
Wushu practitioners at the 2006 Asian Games
Filipino martial artists
Competitors at the 2008 Beijing Wushu Tournament
Southeast Asian Games gold medalists for the Philippines
Southeast Asian Games silver medalists for the Philippines
Southeast Asian Games bronze medalists for the Philippines
Chinese emigrants to the Philippines
Filipino people of Chinese descent